The Fort of Huy or the Citadel of Huy, known locally as The Castle, is a fortress located in the Walloon city of Huy in the province of Liège, Belgium. The fort occupies a high position in the town, overlooking the strategic Meuse river. The site of the citadel has been fortified since the ninth century, and various structures have been built on the site. The current fort dates to in 1818 during the period of Dutch rule in Belgium and took five years to build. 

The Citadel was frequently used to house political prisoners. In the 19th century, members of the revolutionary Belgian Legion were imprisoned after their failed invasion of Belgium at Risquons-Tout in 1848. During the German occupation of Belgium in World War II, six thousand Belgian political prisoners, including the Communist Julien Lahaut, were held at the citadel and many were later sent to concentration camps in Germany.

Together with Dinant, Liège and Namur, the Citadel of Huy forms part of the so-called Meuse Citadels.

External links

Fort de Huy: Mémorial national
Citadelle de Huy at Châteaux de la Meuse

References

Prisons in Belgium
World War II sites in Belgium
Huy
 Huy
Huy